America Ammayi is a 1976 Indian Telugu-language film directed by Singeetam Srinivasa Rao. The cross over film was based on the story of Telugu cultural importance in comparison to the western culture. French dancer Annick Chaymotty, known under her stage name Devayani, acted in the main role. She was learning Kuchipudi dance from Vempati Chinna Satyam. The film was a remake of the 1975 Tamil film Melnaattu Marumagal.

Plot 

Sridhar is an Indian youth staying in the United States. He marries an American woman Neena and brings her to India. His parents refuse to accept her into their house. Neena learns the Indian culture including language, dance and singing and impresses them. They finally accept her as their daughter-in-law.

Cast 
Annick Chaymotty as Neena/Meena
Ranganath as Anand
Deepa as Sudha
Sreedhar as Mohan
Pandari Bai as Janaki
Sarath Babu as Raju

Production 
America Ammayi was directed by Singeetam Srinivasa Rao and produced by N Krishnam Raju of Navata Arts. Cinematography is by Balu Mahendra. In the title card, the lead actress Annick Chaymotty alias Devayani is erroneously credited as Anna Koria/Devayani.

Soundtrack 
The music of the film was composed by G. K. Venkatesh. The song "Oka Venuvu Vinipinchenu" marks the playback singing debut of G. Anand.

References

External links 
 

1970s Telugu-language films
1976 films
Films directed by Singeetam Srinivasa Rao
Films scored by G. K. Venkatesh
Films about women in the Indian diaspora
Films set in St. Louis
Films shot in India
Films shot in New York City
Indian films set in New York City
Telugu remakes of Tamil films